The 2002 ACC Trophy was a cricket tournament held from 10 to 21 July 2002 in Singapore. It gave Associate and Affiliate members of the Asian Cricket Council experience of international one-day cricket and also helped form an essential part of regional rankings.

The tournament was won by the United Arab Emirates, who defeated Nepal in the final by six wickets. This was the UAE's second consecutive title.

Teams
The following ten teams took part in the tournament:

Group stages
The ten teams were divided into two groups of five, with the top two from each group qualifying for the semi-finals.

Group A

Group B

Semi-finals

Final

Statistics

References

External links
CricketArchive tournament page 

ACC Trophy
Acc Trophy, 2002
International cricket competitions in 2002
International cricket competitions in Singapore